Fasa University of Medical Sciences is a public university in Fasa, Iran. The university has four faculties including medicine, health care, nursing, and paramedicine.

References

External links
 "Official Website of the Fasa University of Medical Sciences"

Fasa, University of Medical Sciences
Fasa, University of Medical Sciences
Education in Fars Province
Buildings and structures in Fars Province